Dipole moment may refer to: 

Electric dipole moment, the measure of the electrical polarity of a system of charges
Transition dipole moment, the electrical dipole moment in quantum mechanics
Molecular dipole moment, the electric dipole moment of a molecule.
Bond dipole moment, the measure of polarity of a chemical bond
Electron electric dipole moment, the measure of the charge distribution within an electron
Magnetic dipole moment, the measure of the magnetic polarity of a system of charges
Electron magnetic moment
Nuclear magnetic moment, the magnetic moment of an atomic nucleus
Topological dipole moment, the measure of the topological defect charge distribution
The first order term (or the second term) of the multipole expansion of a function         
The dielectric constant of a solvent; the measure of its capacity to break the covalent molecules into ions

See also
 Dipole (disambiguation)
 Moment (disambiguation)